Back to the Future: The Game is an episodic graphic adventure video game based on the Back to the Future film franchise. The game was developed and published by Telltale Games as part of a licensing deal with Universal Pictures. Bob Gale, the co-creator, co-writer, and co-producer of the film trilogy, assisted Telltale in writing the game's story. Original actors Michael J. Fox and Christopher Lloyd allowed the developers to use their likenesses in the game for the lead characters Marty McFly and Doc Brown, respectively. Although Lloyd reprises his role as Doc, A.J. Locascio plays the role of Marty, while Fox later appeared to voice two cameo roles in the final episode, reprising his role as future versions of Marty McFly in addition to playing his forefather William.

The game is split-up into five episodes available on multiple gaming platforms, the first episode released for Microsoft Windows and OS X on December 22, 2010. PlayStation 3 and iOS versions followed in February 2011. Episodes 2 through 5 were released throughout February to June 2011, with the final episode released on June 23. Telltale published the series as retail products for the PlayStation 3 and Wii consoles for North America. Deep Silver published the retail PlayStation 3 and Wii versions for Europe on May 4, 2012. To commemorate the films' 30th anniversary, Telltale Games released the game on PlayStation 4, Xbox 360, and Xbox One on October 13, 2015. The ports feature updated voice work from Tom Wilson, who played Biff Tannen in the films (Biff was voiced by Kid Beyond in the original release).

Gameplay 
Back to the Future: The Game is a graphic adventure played from a third-person perspective. The player controls Marty to explore the 3D environments using either the keyboard, mouse or game controller to move around. The player can have Marty examine objects, talk to non-player characters (initiating dialog through conversation trees), and perform specific actions in order to solve puzzles and progress the game. Some items can be picked up and stored in Marty's inventory, and then can be used later to interact with other characters or objects. The game provides a list of current goals for the player to complete to advance the game. The player can access a hint system, revealing one clue at a time from a number of cryptic clues for how to solve a specific puzzle.

Plot

It has been six months since Marty McFly witnessed Dr. Emmett Brown disappear into an unknown time. The bank has begun foreclosing on Doc's home. On May 14, 1986, while helping his father George clear out Doc's possessions, Marty is shocked to see a DeLorean time machine (later revealed to be a temporal duplicate created by the lightning strike in the second film) appear outside the house, having previously witnessed its destruction. Inside is Einstein, Doc's dog, and a tape recorder with a message from Doc explaining how the DeLorean would return to this present should Doc fall on hard times. Einstein helps track down Edna Strickland, the elderly sister of Marty's school disciplinarian and a former reporter for Hill Valley's paper. Reading her newspaper collection, Marty learns that Doc, who was disguised under the alias "Carl Sagan" to hide his true identity, was arrested in 1931 and killed by Irving "Kid" Tannen, Biff Tannen's father. Marty recalibrates the DeLorean to take him to just before Doc's murder.

Marty arrives on June 13, 1931, and learns that Doc was accused of arson upon Kid's illegal speakeasy and thus needs to break out of jail. Doc tells Marty to seek the aid of his younger self, Emmett, who at this point in time assists his father, who staunchly resents Emmett's dream of a career in science, at the courthouse. Along the way, Marty encounters his grandfather Arthur "Artie" McFly, Officer Danny Parker (his girlfriend Jennifer's grandfather), and a young Edna. While convincing Emmett to help, Marty delivers a subpoena to Artie, who serves as Kid's accountant, persuading him to testify against Kid and help prove Doc's innocence. Believing all has been fixed, Doc and Marty prepare to return to the present when Marty starts to fade away. Doc discovers Artie would be killed the next day for testifying, thus erasing Marty's existence. Travelling back in time, they convince Artie to lay low after testifying while avoiding their past selves.

Returning to May 15, 1986, they realize that their actions in the past have prevented the arrest of Kid Tannen, allowing him to expand his criminal operations. As a result of this, the Tannen family became the fifth-most-dangerous crime family in California, owning all of Hill Valley. Marty and Doc travel to August 25, 1931, the day Kid was supposed to be arrested. The duo find another option: they convince Trixie Trotter, Kid's moll who has a soft-spot for Artie, to testify instead. The cop (Danny Parker) who was meant to arrest Kid has been demoted because of Marty and Doc's tampering, causing his girlfriend Betty (Jennifer's grandmother) to dump him and he now works for Kid to earn some extra money. After Marty restores his confidence, Parker decides to turn against Kid to win back Betty. Kid and his gang are jailed, and all appears to be in-order. Doc reveals that this is also the night that motivated him to finish his rocket car experiment for the Hill Valley Science Expo. He went to see Frankenstein when he was stressed and was inspired, even keeping the ticket stub until 1986. Marty and Doc return to the future unaware that their actions have caused Edna to fall in love with Emmett, and their relationship causes Emmett to give up on his scientific inventions. The ticket stub starts to fade out of existence as Doc realizes that Edna stopped him from seeing the film.

When they return to 1986 again, Doc and Einstein disappear, and Marty discovers that Hill Valley is now a totalitarian walled society, run by "Citizen Brown". Sneaking inside, Marty learns that Edna has brainwashed Emmett and used his intelligence to craft a perfect society in her eyes. Marty gets close to Citizen Brown and shows him a notebook he recovered from 1986 with the first drawing of Doc's flux capacitor. Citizen Brown is flooded with memories and decides to turn against Edna to fix history. He helps Marty repair the DeLorean and the two travel back to 1931 to try to undo their previous mistakes. However, the damage causes the DeLorean to arrive in October instead of August, when the Science Expo is about to begin and Edna and Emmett's relationship has strengthened. Marty is ready to take whatever steps are needed to end it, but Citizen Brown becomes worried about what will happen to Edna and angry that Marty does not care about her feelings, and drives off alone in the DeLorean to assess the situation.

Marty, with help from Trixie, ends Edna and Emmett's relationship, but Emmett is still reluctant to return to his scientific roots. Marty tries to force Emmett to see Frankenstein to help him, leading to an argument about Emmett's inability to assert himself. A lightning storm erupts, causing Emmett to realize that rockets cannot make the car fly. This memory acts as a replacement for Emmett seeing the creature electrocuted in the film as in the original timeline. The answer is static electricity and Marty helps Emmett convert his rocket car to a new propulsion system in time for the Science Expo. Meanwhile, Edna is picked up by Citizen Brown, and when she explains what Marty has done, Brown decides to help her thwart Marty's plan. At the Expo, Edna and Brown attempt to sabotage Emmett's project, but Marty discovers them in time. During this, he happens to learn that Edna was responsible for the arson of Kid's speakeasy. During the Expo, Emmett successfully demonstrates his flying car, just as Judge Brown arrives. Marty helps Emmett to stand up for his choices. Judge Brown and his son settle their differences, with Emmett's father now accepting his son's scientific views.

Edna is incensed as her plan has been foiled, and when Citizen Brown refuses to help her further, she runs him over with the DeLorean and inadvertently activates the time machine. As he dies and disappears (due to Marty fixing Emmett's timeline), Citizen Brown tells Marty he was right about Edna. Marty gives Emmett a sealed note with instructions to be opened in the future. Shortly after, a second DeLorean appears with Doc at the wheel, having been summoned from 1986 by the note. As they talk about events, the town of Hill Valley disappears around them. They find, from Marty's great-grandfather William "Willie" McFly, that the town burned down shortly after its founding in 1876 with Mary "Scary Mary" Pickford (in fact Edna Strickland) its only remaining inhabitant. Travelling to July 17, 1876, Marty and Doc discover a crazed Edna has travelled there and attempted to burn down the saloon run by Beauregard Tannen, inadvertently taking the rest of Hill Valley with it. They stop Edna before she can commit the act while simultaneously saving her from Tannen's shotgun, returning her and the first DeLorean to the restored Hill Valley of 1931. Edna is quickly arrested, having previously been recorded confessing to arson against Kid's speakeasy. The alternate DeLorean then disappears, having been erased from history. As Marty and Doc are preparing to return, Marty spots Artie and Trixie, having fallen in love with each other, and worries about his future since Artie was to be wed to his grandmother Sylvia. She reveals that “Trixie Trotter” is a stage name and that her name is actually Sylvia Miskin.

Doc and Marty return to 1986 and discover that in this new post-time-travel timeline, there was no estate sale because Doc's reconciliation with his father allowed the Browns to stay part-time in Hill Valley. They find that Edna and Kid had fallen in love while in jail, and afterwards married and both became much happier and friendlier since. Doc reveals his previous absence to Marty; he had been compiling a history of the McFly family to present to Marty as a graduation gift but found information on his grandmother challenging to come across (as she was working under the name Trixie) and thus had travelled to 1931 to attempt to obtain research first-hand. Suddenly, three separate DeLoreans appear, each with a different future version of Marty driving them. They approach Marty and Doc and insist they come to help assure that their respective futures occur as they are supposed to. Doc and his Marty leave the Marties arguing with each other, saying the future can wait until after they have enjoyed the present for a while; they then depart to an unknown time.

Development 
Back to the Future: The Game was announced by developer Telltale Games in early June 2010, as part of a licensing deal to create video games based on Universal Pictures' Back to the Future and Jurassic Park film series. The title is split-up into five episodes and was available for Microsoft Windows, OS X, PlayStation 3, Wii (as a single retail release) and iOS.

The development team sought input from fans on various scenarios by means of an online survey and brought in trilogy co-creator, co-writer and co-producer Bob Gale as story consultant. Several concepts he and director Robert Zemeckis had originally conceived for Part II, such as the exploration of the Prohibition era and Doc's family history, were reworked into the game. Telltale Games found adhering to the films' established timelines to be one of the greatest challenges regarding the development of the script. Many ideas had to be scrapped due to conflicts that would have caused paradoxes with the stories of the films. Gale stated that although the game is not part of the series canon, it is possible that it could take place in alternate timelines.

Three months after its initial announcement, the team revealed the first piece of concept art for the protagonists, created by artist Ryan Jones and based on actors Michael J. Fox and Christopher Lloyd, who allowed their likenesses to be used for the in-game characters. Season designer and writer Michael Stemmle emphasized that the game's graphics would take a less realistic and more stylized approach while trying to stay true to the feel of the trilogy. The puzzles were designed to rely on applying items in the inventory to characters and objects as the developers did not think of Marty as a protagonist that would build a gadget from various parts.

Audio
As Michael J. Fox was unavailable to reprise his role as Marty for the game, newcomer A.J. Locascio voiced the character instead, though Fox later provided voice work for Marty's great-grandfather William in the fifth and final episode of the game, as well as for the three futuristic versions of Marty who appear in the game's final cutscene. Locascio was able to get the part when his audition sample ended up in the email inbox of voice director Julian Kwasneski, and managed to impress both Gale and Lloyd with how closely it resembled the sound of Fox's voice during the time the trilogy was filmed. Lloyd returned to voice Doc Brown and began his first recording session for the game in late September 2010. Later, Claudia Wells joined the cast, reprising her role as Jennifer Parker from the first film. Kid Beyond provided the voice for Biff Tannen in place of actor Tom Wilson in the game's original release, but Wilson returned to voice the character for the 30th anniversary re-release. James Arnold Taylor voiced the younger Emmett Brown. Though the game features other returning characters including George and Lorraine McFly, voicework for these characters are provided by a variety of voice actors in the Bay Area. The song Back in Time by Huey Lewis and the News, which was written for the first film, appears in the game.

The full voice cast for the games is listed below:

 A.J. Locascio - Marty McFly/Leech
 Michael J. Fox as William McFly/Future Marty McFly
 Christopher Lloyd - Dr. Emmett Brown/Citizen Brown/Jacques Douteux
 James Arnold Taylor as Young Emmett Brown
 Kid Beyond (original release) / Thomas F. Wilson (2015 re-release) - Biff Tannen
 Owen Thomas - Kid Tannen/Beauregard Tannen
 Michael X. Sommers - George McFly/Arthur McFly
 Aimee Miles - Lorraine Baines McFly
 Claudia Wells - Jennifer Parker
 Melissa Hutchison - Trixie Trotter
 Rebecca Sweitzer - Edna Strickland
 Shannon Nicholson - Young Edna Strickland
 Mark Barbolak - Detective Danny Parker/Detective Danny Parker, Jr.

Promotion 
 
To promote the title, Telltale brought a replica of the DeLorean time machine as part of their booth display at the 2010 Penny Arcade Expo which occurred shortly after the game's announcement. Prior to the game's release, Telltale Games published their first Facebook game, Back to the Future: Blitz Through Time, with mechanics similar to Bejeweled Blitz, to tie in with the episodic series. It has been taken down as of 2012.

A voucher for a free copy of the first episode of the series was included in the 25th Anniversary Blu-ray release of the Back to the Future trilogy on October 26, 2010. A promotional offer was made on Telltale's web site to download a free copy as well. Via this promotion, however, the first episode began distribution on February 16, 2011. As of April 2011, Telltale offered the first episode for free for anyone with a registered account at their website. As a pre-order bonus, Telltale offered buyers a free copy of Puzzle Agent, access to a pre-release insider forum on their web site, and stated that they would donate one dollar to the Michael J. Fox Foundation for Parkinson's Research for each pre-order.

Release 
The first episode of Back to the Future: The Game  was released for free on via Telltale Games' website, for both PC and OS X on December 22, 2010, with a later release for the PlayStation 3, also made free on the PlayStation Store, on February 15, 2011, and iOS two days later.

Subsequent episodes were later released for each of these platforms on the following dates:

 Episode 2 was released on PC and OS X on February 16, 2011; on PlayStation 3 on March 29, 2011; and on iOS on April 20, 2011.
 Episode 3 was released on PC and OS X on March 29, 2011; on PlayStation 3 on May 3, 2011; and on iOS on May 26, 2011.
 Episode 4 was released on PC and OS X on April 29, 2011; on PlayStation 3 on June 7, 2011; and on iOS on June 2, 2011
 Episode 5 was released on PC and OS X on June 23, 2011; on PlayStation 3 on July 26, 2011; and on iOS on July 21, 2011.

The same year, a full retail version consisting of all five episodes for PC was released on September 29, and on PlayStation 3 and Wii on October 25, across North America; EU versions for all three platforms were released the following year. Additional releases for PlayStation 4, Xbox 360, and Xbox One were released globally in October 2015.

The game was free for PlayStation Plus subscribers in January 2012. 

The game was delisted from all digital storefronts by the end of 2018, following the closure of Telltale Games.

Reception

Back to the Future: The Game received generally positive reviews. The first episode, "It's About Time", was praised by several reviewers as an effective start to the series. IGN's Greg Miller gave the episode a score of 8.5/10, writing, "it's a movie-inspired game that doesn't suck. Instead, it pushes the characters in interesting directions and whips up a good story". Miller praised Telltale Games for recreating the Back to the Future universe with attention to detail and for the iteration's witty dialogue. Nathan Meunier of GameSpot gave the episode a 7.5/10 score, saying the series "shows a lot of promise with its debut installment". The review added that "the entertaining story that follows is enhanced by believable character interactions, imbuing the adventure with a great sense of authenticity". Meunier did note that the installment was "surprisingly light on challenge and content". Ben PerLee from GameZone summarized his praise of the game by saying it is a "feel good cinematic experience that any fan of Back to the Future will want to check out, and everyone else would do well to check it out". PALGN gave the installment a 7/10, saying that fans of the films "will find plenty to love with all of the callbacks and nostalgic moments", but calling the game's pace slow and the 1930s setting uninspiring. The review concluded: "Fans will delight in the more nostalgic and clever moments of "It's About Time", but it's a short, easy and somewhat bland introduction to the series, which we hope still has time to get a lot better". In a 2/5 stars review, The Escapist said the first episode of the game "doesn't quite get the tone [of the films] right and fails to offer up much compelling gameplay". The reviewer called the setting, situations, and characters "bland", further describing the characters as "cardboard nobodies", and did not review the rest of the series. The consensus among critics was that the voice acting was exceptional, with particular praise directed at A.J. Locascio's impersonation of Michael J. Fox as Marty McFly. Most reviewers were critical of the episode's puzzles as being too simplistic and easy. Review aggregator Metacritic assigned the episode an average review score of 74/100.

Official Nintendo Magazine gave the Wii version of the game 78%.

Back to the Future: The Game was Telltale's most successful franchise prior to the release of The Walking Dead: The Game.

The game reached number 3 in the PS3 sales charts.

Other media
In 2016, IDW Publishing released Back to the  Future: Citizen Brown, a comic book of the game and adapted by Bob Gale and Erik Burnham. It was released over five issues from May to September. The comic follows the story of the game albeit with some minor changes, which according to Bob Gale: "...I convinced IDW to go back in time with me to correct a few mistakes we made the first time around, as well as to set up some things that pay off cleverly in true BTTF style".

References

Notes

Sources

External links 

 Back to the Future: The Game at Telltale Games

2010 video games
Back to the Future (franchise) video games
Episodic video games
IOS games
MacOS games
PlayStation 3 games
PlayStation 4 games
PlayStation Network games
Point-and-click adventure games
Single-player video games
Telltale Games games
Video games about time travel
Video games about multiple time paths
Video games developed in the United States
Video games scored by Jared Emerson-Johnson
Video games set in California
Video games set in 1986
Video games set in 1931
Video games set in the 19th century
Windows games
Wii games
Xbox 360 games
Xbox One games
Video games using cast members from original production
Video games based on films
Deep Silver games